State Highway 265 (SH 265) is a Colorado state highway linking Denver and Commerce City. SH 265's southern terminus is at Interstate 70 (I-70) in Denver, and the northern terminus is at U.S. Route 6 (US 6) and US 85 in Commerce City.

Route description
SH 265 runs , starting at a junction with  I-70 in Denver.  The highway goes northwest, passes under I-270 without any access to it, and ends at a junction with  US 6 / US 85 in Commerce City. Most of its segment inside Denver is maintained locally.

Major intersections

See also

 List of state highways in Colorado

References

External links

265
Transportation in Denver
Transportation in Adams County, Colorado
Commerce City, Colorado